Naher Aisha is a neighborhood in Damascus, Syria.

References

Damascus